Bryony Kate Frances Page (born 10 December 1990) is a British individual trampoline gymnast. She is the 2021 women's individual trampoline world champion, and part of the British team that won team gold at the 2013 world championships.

Page became the first British trampolinist to win an Olympic medal at the 2016 Summer Olympics in Rio de Janeiro, when she won the silver medal. Five years later, at the delayed 2020 Summer Olympics in Tokyo she once more reached the podium winning a bronze medal. In doing so she became the first British female gymnast in any gymnastic discipline to win medals across two or more Games.

Early life and education
Page was born in Crewe and brought up in Wrenbury, near Nantwich. She attended Brine Leas School and Malbank School and Sixth Form College. She took up trampolining at the age of nine.

Page studied biology at the University of Sheffield, where she received a sports scholarship. She graduated in 2015 with a first-class honours degree, with her dissertation being a study of sounds made by dinosaurs. After graduating she concentrated full-time on trampolining.

Career
Early in her career Page struggled with the yips (a loss of fine motor skills in athletes) for two years which affected her confidence and performance, but she overcame it in 2010 with the help of a confidence coach. She competed in her first World Championships in 2010, where she finished fourth in the individual event. At the 2011 World Championships she was part of the team that won the silver medal in the team event. She missed the 2012 Olympic Games in London due to illness and injury problems, but won the individual gold medal at the 2012 World Cup in Sofia.

She won three successive British Championship titles between 2013 and 2015, and was a member of the British teams that won gold at the 2013 World Championships, and the 2014 and 2016 European Championships. She finished fifth in the individual event at the 2015 World Championships.

At the 2016 Olympic Games in Rio de Janeiro, Page and her British teammate Kat Driscoll became Great Britain's first ever finalists in trampolining, with Page qualifying in seventh position. During the final she posted a score of 56.040 which put her in the lead, until defending champion Rosie MacLennan scored 56.465 dropping Page into the second place. Page won the silver medal, the first time that any British trampolinist had won an Olympic medal. At the 2020 Olympic Games in Tokyo, held in 2021 due to the COVID-19 pandemic, Page won a bronze medal. Later that year, Page won individual gold and was part of the team that won bronze in the team event at the 2021 World Championships.

Awards and honours
She was awarded an honorary doctorate from The University of Sheffield (2023) for giving distinguished service or bringing distinction to the University, the City of Sheffield, or the region.

References

External links
 
 
 

1990 births
Living people
British female trampolinists
Medalists at the 2016 Summer Olympics
Sportspeople from Crewe
Olympic silver medallists for Great Britain
Alumni of the University of Sheffield
Gymnasts at the 2016 Summer Olympics
Olympic medalists in gymnastics
Olympic gymnasts of Great Britain
People educated at Brine Leas School
Medalists at the Trampoline Gymnastics World Championships
Gymnasts at the 2020 Summer Olympics
Medalists at the 2020 Summer Olympics
English Olympic medallists
21st-century British women